We Didn't Even Suspect That He Was the Poppy Salesman is the debut solo album by Martin Tielli of the band Rheostatics, released in 2001 on Six Shooter Records.

Track listing
 I'll Never Tear You Apart
 My Sweet Relief
 Double X
 Voices from the Wilderness
 World in a Wall
 That's How They Do it in Warsaw
 How Can You Sleep?
 She Said, "We're on Our Way Down"
 From the Reel
 Wetbrain/Your War

2001 debut albums
Martin Tielli albums
Six Shooter Records albums
Albums produced by Michael Phillip Wojewoda